Christine Y. Kim is an American curator of contemporary art. She is currently the Britton Family Curator-at-Large at Tate. Prior to this post, Kim held the position of Curator of Contemporary Art at the Los Angeles County Museum of Art. Before her appointment at LACMA in 2009, she was Associate Curator at The Studio Museum in Harlem in New York. She is best known for her exhibitions of and publications on artists of color, diasporic and marginalized discourses, and 21st-century technology and artistic practices.

Life and education 

 Kim was born in Southern California and grew up in the San Francisco Bay Area
 1998 M.A. Gallatin School of Individualized Study, American Studies and Critical Theory Interdisciplinary, New York University. Masters Thesis: Mutation, Aura and the Art Experience in Cyberspace, 1999  
 1993 B.A. Connecticut College, New London. Double Major: Art History and French; Minor: Asian/Asian-American Studies
 1992-93 Year Abroad, Université Paris Sorbonne and L’Institut Catholique, Paris, France 
 1991 Yonsei University International Division, Korean Language program, Seoul, Korea

Career 
Kim’s first museum job after graduate school was in the bookstore at the Whitney Museum of American Art in 1999. She was quickly hired as a writer in the Education Department, contributing research and texts on artists and works of art in the permanent collection for The American Century where she met other aspiring young curators and writers focusing on works of art by artists of color such as Franklin Sirmans and Lisa Dent.

In 2000, following the appointments of Lowery Stokes Sims and Thelma Golden as Director and Deputy Director for Exhibitions and Programs, respectively, at the Studio Museum in Harlem, Kim was hired as Curatorial Assistant. Through her promotions to Assistant Curator and to Associate Curator during her eight-year tenure, Kim organized numerous exhibitions: the groundbreaking Freestyle (2000), popularizing the term “post-black art” and featuring work by artists such as Mark Bradford, Jennie C. Jones, Dave McKenzie, and Julie Mehretu; Black Belt (2003) an exhibition that featured works by Black and, for the first time in the museum’s history, Asian American artists such as Sanford Biggers, Patty Chang, Ellen Gallagher, David Hammons, Arthur Jafa, and Glenn Kaino, and their musing on cross cultural connections and hybridities growing out of 1970s popular culture; and Henry Taylor: Sis and Bra (2007), the artist’s first solo museum exhibition.

By 2007, Kim was working between New York and Los Angeles. She presented exhibitions such as Kehinde Wiley: World Stage Lagos - Dakar (2008) and Flow (2008), referred to as the “African ‘F’ show” featuring work by artists from Africa such as Latifa Echakhch, Nicholas Hlobo, Otobong Nkanga, and Lynette Yiadom-Boakye at the Studio Museum, while co-founding the Los Angeles Nomadic Division (LAND) a non-profit committed to temporary, site-specific public art exhibitions with curator Shamim M. Momin.

In late 2009, Kim was hired as Associate Curator at the Los Angeles County Museum of Art (LACMA) by CEO and Wallis Annenberg Director Michael Govan whose aim was to create a contemporary art team led by curators of color to better reflect the community, county and country. To date, Kim has organized numerous exhibitions and projects, most notably James Turell: A Retrospective (2013-14), co-curated with Govan, which won first place for the Best Monographic Museum Exhibition in the U.S. by the International Art Critics Association (AICA-USA), and was presented concurrent with major solo presentations of Turrell’s work at the Solomon R. Guggenheim Museum, New York, and the Museum of Fine Arts Houston (MFAH); Human Nature: Contemporary Art from the Collection (2011), co-curated with Franklin Sirmans that presented approximately 75 works of art from the museum's permanent collection; Isaac Julien: Playtime (2019) that marked the artist’s first major presentation in Los Angeles; and Julie Mehretu (2019-2021) a critically-acclaimed mid-career survey curated with Rujeko Hockley, Assistant Curator at the Whitney Museum of American Art, which traveled to the High Museum of Art, Atlanta and the Walker Art Center, Minneapolis. In 2019, Kim was promoted to full curator at LACMA. 

In addition to an institutional career of over two decades, Kim has co-founded and partnered with local, national and international organizations, as a champion of social and racial justice, representation, and equity in exhibitions, acquisitions and museological practices, as well as community alliances and engagement. In 2017, she co-founded GYOPO, a diasporic Korean contemporary art and culture non-profit with Commonwealth & Council founder Young Chung, Human Resources co-founder Eric Kim, Equitable Vitrines (EV) Executive Director and co-founder Ellie Lee, artist Yong Soon Min, artist Jennifer Moon and artist Gala Porras-Kim, among others, committed to free public programming, community allyship and BIPOC solidarity. In collaboration with For Freedoms, LACMA, GYOPO, and Stop DiscriminAsian (SDA), Kim pioneered a series of groundbreaking virtual panel discussions in 2020 Racism is a Public Health Issue: Addressing Prejudices Against Asian Americans during the COVID-19 including historian Jeff Chang and artist Anicka Yi; Examining the Impact of Police Brutality on Black Communities including filmmaker Ava DuVernay and Rashid Johnson; and Essentially Forgotten: How COVID-19 Impacts Frontline Workers including Dolores Huerta and Chon Noriega during the pandemic. Kim’s ongoing work extends into mentorship, lectures, advocacy and education.

List of exhibitions

Los Angeles County Museum of Art, Los Angeles, Curator, 2019 – present 

 Black American Portraits co-curated with Liz Andrews, 2021
 Julie Mehretu,* 2019 - 2021 co-organized with the Whitney Museum of American Art, New York, 2020; traveling to the High Museum of Art, Atlanta 2020-21; and the Walker Art Center, Minneapolis, 2021

Los Angeles County Museum of Art, Los Angeles, Associate Curator, 2010 – 2021 

 Isaac Julien: Playtime, 2019 
 Frances Stark: The Magic Flute, 2017
 Diana Thater: The Sympathetic Imagination,* 2015 co-curated with Lynne Cooke; toured Museum of Contemporary Art, Chicago, 2016–17
 My Barbarian: Double Agency, co-curated with Rita Gonzalez, 2015 
 James Turrell: A Retrospective,* 2013-15 co-curated with Michael Govan in conjunction with the Museum of Fine Arts, Houston and the Solomon R. Guggenheim Foundation, New York; toured National Gallery of Australia, Canberra, 2014 and The Israel Museum, Jerusalem, 2014–15
 Figure and Form in Contemporary Photography: Selections from the Permanent Collection, 2012
 Christian Marclay: The Clock, 2011, 2012, 2015					
 Human Nature: Selections from the Permanent Collection, 2011			
 Teresa Margolles in collaboration with Los Angeles Nomadic Division (LAND), 2010–11

The Studio Museum in Harlem, New York, Associate Curator, 2004 – 08 

 Kehinde Wiley: World Stage Africa, Lagos – Dakar,* 2008 
 Flow* 2008
 Odili Donald Odita: Equalizer, 2008
 Portraits, Landscapes and Abstractions: Highlights from The Studio Museum in Harlem Permanent Collection at City Hall,* Hon. Michael Bloomberg, 2007–09
 Midnight’s Daydream: Artists-in-Residence,* 2007
 Henry Taylor: Sis and Bra, 2007
 Philosophy of Time Travel,* 2007
 Collection in Context: Silhouette, 2007
 Quid Pro Quo: Artists-in-Residence,* 2006
 Nadine Robinson: Alles Grau,* 2006
 Frequency,* 2005
 Collection in Context: Selections from the Permanent Collection, 2005
 Meschac Gaba: Tresses,* 2005
 Scratch: Artists-in-Residence,* 2005
 Lamar Peterson: Picture in a Picture, 2005

The Studio Museum in Harlem, Assistant Curator, 2002 – 2004 

 Figuratively* 2004
 Veni Vidi Video II, 2004
 Hands On, Hands Down: Artists-in-Residence,* 2003
 Black Belt,* 2003.
 Veni Vidi Video, 2003
 Collection in Context: Selections from the Permanent Collection, 2002
 Ironic Iconic: Artists-in-Residence,* 2002
 Edgar Arceneaux: Drawings of Removal, 2002

The Studio Museum in Harlem, New York, Curatorial Assistant, 2000 – 2002 

 Africaine, 2001
 Freestyle,* 2001
 John Bankston: Capture and Escape of Mr. M, Ch. 1, 2001
 Harlem Postcards (ongoing seasonal project), 2002 – 2007

Guest-curated exhibitions 

 Co-curator, 12th Gwangju Biennale The Ends: Politics of Participation in the Post-Internet Age, 2019*
 Curatorial Advisor, Prospect.3 Notes for Now, New Orleans, 2013*
 Curator, Art Public, Art Basel Miami Beach, 2012
 Curator, Art Public, Art Basel Miami Beach, 2011
 Curator, 19th Annual, Korean Cultural Center, Los Angeles, 2011
 Curator, 18th Annual, Korean Cultural Center, Los Angeles, 2010
 Co-curator, We Want a New Object, California Institute of the Arts M.F.A. exhibition, Los Angeles, 2008
 Curator, Peter Norton Residence, CPW1, New York, 2005–06
 Curator, Purloined, Artists Space, New York, 2001
 Curator, The Light Show, Gale Gates (Emerging Curator Series), Brooklyn, 2000

Select publications 

 “1966 and the Light in LA.” Unexpected Light: Works by Young-Il Ahn, Baik Art (2017) 
 “Kori Newkirk.” Issue Magazine (Issue2 2015)
 “Deposing Dualities in Prospect 3.” Prospect 3: Notes for Now, Prestel, NY (2014)
 “Wangechi Mutu: The Pin-ups.” Wangechi Mutu: A Shady Promise, Damiani Press (2008)
 “Mark Bradford: it’s tricky to rock a rhyme to rock a rhyme that’s right on time.” Zing Magazine (Winter 2005)
 “Long Ago and Far Away.” Eduardo Sarabia exhibition catalogue, I-20, New York (2003)
 “Kehinde Wiley Faux Real.” Interview, Issue 7 (Fall 2003), 54-67
 “Colorblind? Luis Gispert, Rico Gatson, Glenn Kaino, Julie Mehretu, Yunhee Min, Kori Newkirk, Nadine Robinson, Eduardo Sarabia, Eric Wesley.” V Magazine (March/April 2003)
 “Faux Real: Interview with Kehinde Wiley.” Black Romantic exhibition catalogue, ed. Thelma Golden, The Studio Museum in Harlem, New York (2002)
 “Candice Breitz: Third Degree Burn.” Candice Breitz exhibition catalogue, Centrum fϋr Gegensartskunst, Linz, Austria (2001)
 “Intervention with Odili Donald Odita.” Odili Donald Odita exhibition catalogue, Florence Lynch, New York (2001)
 “(212) Staging Illusion.” (212): Diti Almog, Wayne Gonzales, Odili Donald Odita, Lisa Ruyter, and John Tremblay exhibition catalogue (2000)
 “From Dual to Plural: Five Korean American Artists.” The Korean War in American Art & Culture: Fifty Years Later exhibition catalogue, East Hampton: Keener’s East End Litho (2000), 31-35

Select archived public talks 

 February 15, 2020, Frieze Los Angeles: Christine Y. Kim in Conversation with Ta-Nehisi Coates and Calida Rawles 

 January 20, 2020 LACMA: In Response to Julie Mehretu: Shifting Architectures and Painted Landscapes

 May 15, 2020, LACMA, GYOPO, SDA: Racism is a Public Health Issue: Addressing Prejudices Against Asian Americans during the COVID-19 

 August 7, 2020 LACMA, For Freedoms, GYOPO, SDA: Racism is a Public Health Issue: Examining the Impact of Police Brutality on Black Communities 

 September 8, 2020 LACMA, Arte Americas, For Freedoms, GYOPO, SDA: Racism is a Public Health Issue: Essentially Forgotten: How COVID-19 Impacts Frontline Workers 

 September 17, 2020 LACMA: View from Here Conversations with Artists: Christine Y Kim and Calida Rawles

 October 22, 2020 High Museum of Art, Atlanta: Conversations with Contemporary Artists Series: Julie Mehretu, Christine Y Kim and Rujeko Hockley, moderated by Michael Rooks

 September 21, 2014 Art Catalogues, LACMA: Christine Y Kim and Daniel J. Martinez on The Report of my Death is an Exaggeration; Memoirs: Of Becoming Narrenschiff

 December, 2011 Art Salon Art Public, Art Basel Miami Beach: Christine Y Kim in Conversation with Theaster Gates and Glenn Kaino

References

External links
Barreneche, Raul. "House Proud; Fine, Found And Borrowed". New York Times 27 June 2004. 
LAND

American art curators
American women curators
Living people
Year of birth missing (living people)
Connecticut College alumni
21st-century American women